Alibi is a 1942 British mystery film directed by Brian Desmond Hurst and starring Margaret Lockwood, James Mason and Hugh Sinclair. It was based on the novel L'Alibi by Marcel Achard.

Premise
Police hunt for the killer of a nightclub hostess in pre-war Paris.

Cast
 Margaret Lockwood as Helene Ardouin 
 Hugh Sinclair as Inspector Calas 
 James Mason as Andre Laurent 
 Raymond Lovell as Prof. Winkler 
 Enid Stamp-Taylor as Dany 
 Hartley Power as Gordon 
 Jane Carr as Delia 
 Edana Romney as Winkler's Assistant 
 Rodney Ackland as Winker's Assistant 
 Elisabeth Welch as Singer 
 Olga Lindo as Mlle. Loureau 
 Muriel George as Mme. Bretonnet 
 George Merritt as Bourdille 
 Judy Gray as Josette 
 Philip Leaver as Dodo

Production
Lockwood had just given birth to her daughter. It was the first time Lockwood worked with James Mason. She said Mason wanted star billing and was unhappy at being given feature billing. She said the film "was anything but a success" but enjoyed working with him saying he "was a wonderful artist and extremely easy to work with. He was one of the people who helped me to enjoy making that rather bad film and to enjoy getting back into the routine of my work again." Lockwood and James Mason would shortly become huge stars with The Man in Grey.

Critical reception
In a contemporary review, The Monthly Film Bulletin wrote, "here is a bright film with a bit of everything in it...The film is well directed, and Margaret Lockwood makes an appealing Helene, with James Mason playing opposite to her. Raymond Lovell is first-class as the sinister Winkler, and Rodney Ackland as his assistant and Principal Villain No. 2, plays up to him well, introducing an element of melodrama. The other members of the cast team up to make the whole a creditable production."

References

External links
 
Alibi at Britmovie
  www.briandesmondhurst.org- official legacy website of the director with filmography including Alibi

1942 films
1940s mystery drama films
1942 crime drama films
British mystery drama films
British crime drama films
1940s English-language films
Gainsborough Pictures films
Films directed by Brian Desmond Hurst
British remakes of French films
Films set in Paris
Films scored by Jack Beaver
British black-and-white films
1940s British films